Jerry James (or variants) may refer to:

Jerry James (radio), of Heart Kent
Gerry James, Canadian football player
Jerry James, co-founder of Burning Man
Jerry James, fictional character in Milwaukee, Minnesota

See also
Gerard James (disambiguation)
Gerald James (disambiguation)
Jeremy James (disambiguation)